Woo Ha-ram (born 21 March 1998) is a South Korean diver. He competed in the men's 3 metre springboard and men's 10 metre platform at the 2016 Summer Olympics, where he finished 24th out of 29 competitors and 11th out of 28 competitors, respectively.

Woo qualified for the 2020 Summer Olympics in the men's 3 metre springboard and the men's 10 metre platform events. He finished fourth in the 3 metre event, the best ever finish by a South Korean diver at the Olympics.

Early life

He took up the sport in the first grade of primary school in 2005.

References

External links
 
 
 

1998 births
Living people
Divers at the 2016 Summer Olympics
South Korean male divers
Olympic divers of South Korea
Universiade medalists in diving
Asian Games medalists in diving
Asian Games silver medalists for South Korea
Asian Games bronze medalists for South Korea
Divers at the 2014 Asian Games
Divers at the 2018 Asian Games
Medalists at the 2014 Asian Games
Medalists at the 2018 Asian Games
Universiade silver medalists for South Korea
Universiade bronze medalists for South Korea
Medalists at the 2017 Summer Universiade
Divers at the 2020 Summer Olympics
Sportspeople from Busan
21st-century South Korean people